Kissimmee is the largest city and county seat of Osceola County, Florida, United States. As of the 2020 census, the population was 79,226. It is a Principal City of the Orlando-Kissimmee-Sanford, Florida, Metropolitan Statistical Area, which had a 2020 population of 2,673,376. The Census Bureau defines an urban area with Kissimmee as the principal city, which is separated from the Orlando urban area. The Kissimmee–St. Cloud, FL urban area had a 2020 population of 418,404, making it the 100th largest in the United States.

History 

This area was originally named Allendale, after Confederate Major J. H. Allen who operated the first cargo steamboat along the Kissimmee River—the Mary Belle. It was renamed Kissimmee when incorporated as a city in 1883. The modern town, which is the county seat of Osceola County, was founded before the Civil War by the Bass, Johnson and Overstreet families.  The etymology of the name Kissimmee is debated, apart from general agreement that it is Native American in origin. Its growth can be credited to Hamilton Disston of Philadelphia, who based his four-million acre (8,000 km2) drainage operation out of the small town. Disston had contracted with the financially wobbly state of Florida to drain its southern lands, for which he would own half of all he successfully drained. This deal made Disston the largest single landowner in the United States.

Disston's dredging and land speculation required a small steamboat industry to transport people and goods along the new waterway. The Kissimmee shipyard was responsible for building most of these large steamships, which were just one jump ahead of civilization—with Kissimmee as the jumping off point. Concurrently, the South Florida Railroad was growing and extended the end of its line from Sanford down to Kissimmee, making the town on Lake Tohopekaliga a transportation hub for Central Florida. On February 12, 1885, the Florida Legislature incorporated the Kissimmee City Street Railway.

But the heyday of Kissimmee was short-lived. Expanding railroads began to challenge the steamships for carrying freight and passengers. By 1884, the South Florida Railroad, now part of the Plant System, had extended its tracks to Tampa. The Panic of 1893 was the worst depression the U.S. had experienced up to that time, crushing land speculation and unsound debt. Hamilton Disston closed his Kissimmee land operation. Consecutive freezes in 1894 and 1895 wiped out the citrus industry. The freezes, combined with South Florida's growth and the relocation of steamship operations to Lake Okeechobee, left Kissimmee dependent on open range cattle ranching.

Kissimmee had a population of 4,310 in 1950. At that point there was some citrus packing as well as the ranching.

Ranching remained an important part of the local economy until the opening of nearby Walt Disney World in 1971. After that, tourism and development supplanted cattle ranching to a large measure. However, even though the Disney facility  took over much of the open range cattle lands, cattle ranches still operate nearby, particularly in the southern part of Osceola County.

The 1998 Kissimmee tornado outbreak killed dozens of people in the area. On August 13, 2004, Hurricane Charley passed through Kissimmee with winds in excess of 100 miles per hour, damaging homes and buildings, toppling trees and cutting electrical power to the entire city. Kissimmee Utility Authority restored power to 54 percent of the residents in the first 72 hours; 85 percent were restored within one week. Service was restored to all customers on August 28. Three weeks after Hurricane Charley, the area was struck by Hurricane Frances, followed by Hurricane Jeanne three weeks after Frances.

Geography 

Kissimmee and the city of St. Cloud are the only incorporated settlements in the county. The cities lie in proximity to each other along U.S. Highways 192 and 441.

A large geographical area of unincorporated Osceola County also refers to their area as Kissimmee. This includes most of the 192 corridor west of the city border to Highway 27, areas north of the city to Hunters Creek, and areas south of the city to Poinciana.

The city is mostly built on deep sand which is poorly drained in its natural state. The most common soil series is Myakka.

City water resources

Drained by the Kissimmee River, the city is situated on the northwest shore of Lake Tohopekaliga (locally called Lake Toho, West Lake Toho, or simply West Lake) in central Florida. Shingle Creek, largely considered the headwaters of the Everglades, also runs through the city. Shingle Creek features a popular canoe/kayak trail that runs from Steffe Landing on US 192 and ends in Lake Tohopekaliga.

Downtown

The downtown area lies near the intersection of U.S. Highway 17/92 and U.S. Highway 192. The downtown of Kissimmee does not possess any big skyscrapers; most of the buildings are two or three stories high. The biggest and the tallest building in the downtown is the Osceola County courthouse. The main thoroughfare follows along Highway 17/Highway 92 through the city's center and is a combination of three streets: Main Street, Broadway Street, and Emmett Street. The downtown area consists largely of restaurants, small shops, and historic residences. The University of Central Florida has a business incubator located in the area that is an important part of the economic engine downtown.

Climate

The climate in this area is characterized by hot, humid summers and generally mild, dry, and sunny winters.  According to the Köppen climate classification system, Kissimmee has a humid subtropical climate (Cfa).

Demographics 

In the 2010 census, Kissimmee had a population of 59,682.  The racial and ethnic composition was 58.9% Hispanic (33.1% Puerto Rican, 5.1% Dominican, 4.0% Colombian, 3.9% Mexican, 2.6% Cuban, 1.4% Venezuelan, 0.9% Ecuadorian, 0.7% Salvadoran, 0.7% Peruvian, 0.6% Honduran, 0.6% Nicaraguan) or Latino, 26.2% non-Hispanic White, 9.6% non-Hispanic African American, 2.8% Hispanic Black, 0.6% Native American, 3.4% Asian (1.1% Asian Indian, 0.8% Filipino), 0.1% Pacific Islander, 0.4% Non-Hispanic from some other race and 4.7% two or more races.

Compared to the previous census of 2000, there were 47,814 people, 17,121 households, and 11,813 families residing in the city. The racial makeup of the city was 67.22% White, 9.99% African American, 0.52% Native American, 3.38% Asian, 0.10% Pacific Islander, 14.15% from other races, and 4.66% from two or more races. Hispanic or Latino people of any race were 41.73% of the population. The majority of Hispanics residing in the city are Puerto Ricans. There are also small Colombian, Cuban and Dominican communities residing in and/or around the city.

There were 17,121 households, out of which 37.4% had children under the age of 18 living with them, 47.2% were married couples living together, 15.8% had a female householder with no husband present, and 31.0% were non-families. 20.9% of all households were made up of individuals, and 4.9% had someone living alone who was 65 years of age or older. The average household size was 2.77 and the average family size was 3.21.

In the city, the population was spread out, with 27.0% under the age of 18, 12.0% from 18 to 24, 34.9% from 25 to 44, 18.5% from 45 to 64, and 7.6% who were 65 years of age or older. The median age was 31 years. For every 100 females, there were 98.1 males. For every 100 females age 18 and over, there were 95.8 males.

The median income for a household in the city was $33,949, and the median income for a family was $36,361. Males had a median income of $25,851 versus $21,025 for females. The per capita income for the city was $15,071. About 12.3% of families and 15.4% of the population were below the poverty line, including 19.0% of those under age 18 and 10.2% of those age 65 or over.

Economy 

Multinational multi-level marketing company Tupperware Brands is based in Kissimmee.

Top employers 

According to Kissimmee's 2018 Comprehensive Annual Financial Report, the top employers in the city are:

Arts and culture

Sites of interest

 Colonial Estate
 First United Methodist Church
 Grass Island
 Kissimmee Historic District
 The Loop
 Monument of States
 Old Holy Redeemer Catholic Church
 Old Osceola Courthouse – oldest continually operating courthouse in the state
 Old Town
 Orange World – World's Largest Orange
 Osceola Arts (formally Osceola Center for the Arts)
 Osceola County Courthouse
 Osceola County Welcome Center and History Museum
 Makinson Island
 Margaritaville Resort Orlando
 Pine Island
 Plaza del Sol
 Wat Florida Dhammaram

Former sites of interest

 Jungleland
 Splendid China (defunct in 2003)
 Water Mania
 Xanadu – House of the Future Xanadu Houses (demolished in 2005)

Sports 

The Houston Astros conducted spring training in Kissimmee, at Osceola County Stadium from 1985 to 2016. The stadium also hosts numerous amateur baseball events throughout the remainder of the year in conjunction with; USSSA, Triple Crown Sports, World Baseball Federation and Promotion Sports. The Jim Evans Academy of Professional Umpiring has also called Osceola County Stadium home since 1994.

Austin-Tindall Regional Park is an athletic facility in the area that is host to a variety of annual events.

The city is also home to the annual NCCAA men's soccer National Championship Tournament.

Parks and recreation

Osceola Heritage Park is an event facility featuring a concert arena (Silver Spurs Arena) and professional sports stadium (Osceola County Stadium). The Silver Spurs Arena has been host to many acts, ranging from Hilary Duff and Bob Dylan to an annual rodeo event. Jehovah's Witnesses also use The Silver Spurs Arena for their annual District Conventions. In 2008, a number of English and Spanish conventions were held by the Witnesses, bringing thousands of delegates to the Kissimmee area for the three-day events.

Kissimmee has a number of public parks, including:

 Kissimmee Lakefront Park – Aa$20 million public works project
 Makinson Island Park
 Babb Park at Shingle Creek
 Steffe Landing at Shingle Creek
 Twin Oaks Conservation Area – a popular place with locals for sunset
 Scotty's Landing – a canoe launch/landing featuring an educational area and exercise trail
 Bob Makinson Aquatic Center

Biking

The Shingle Creek Regional Trail (SCRT) is an inter-governmental project that has been planned to connect Kissimmee to Orlando through a 32-mile bicycle trail. It runs along the environmentally sensitive Shingle Creek, and was included on President Obama's America's Great Outdoors list.

Golfing

Kissimmee is home to a number of golf courses and mini-golf courses.

Shopping

Kissimmee is home to The Loop, a large outdoor shopping mall at John Young and Osceola Parkways on the Orange/Osceola County line. It features stores such as American Eagle Outfitters, Kohl's, and Best Buy. There is also a multi-plex theater.

Kissimmee features a unique transformation of the former Osceola Square Mall into a Spanish-style marketplace called Plaza del Sol.

Nearby

Kissimmee is near Orlando, home to Universal Orlando Resort and SeaWorld Orlando, and Lake Buena Vista/Bay Lake, home to Walt Disney World Resort, allowing tourists to access the parks through the city.

Education

Public schools

The School District of Osceola County, Florida serves Kissimmee. High schools include:

 Celebration High School
 Gateway High School
 Harmony High School
 Liberty High School
 Osceola County School for the Arts (6–12)
 Osceola High School
 Poinciana High School
 Saint Cloud High School
 Technical Education Center Osceola
 Tohopekaliga High School
 Neocity Academy

Private schools 

 City of Life, founded 1994
 Freedomland Christian Academy
 Heritage Christian School
 Holy Redeemer Catholic School
 North Kissimmee Christian School, founded 1995
 Osceola Adventist Christian School
 Osceola Christian Preparatory School
 Peace Lutheran School
 Poinciana Academy
 Shady Oaks Private School, founded 1969
 Southland Christian School
 Trinity Lutheran School

Institutions of higher education

State colleges 

 University of Central Florida, Osceola Campus
 Valencia College, Osceola Campus

Private universities, colleges, and others 

 Johnson University Florida, formerly Florida Christian College

Infrastructure

Transportation

Kissimmee features a multi-modal transportation hub located between Neptune Road and Monument Streets. This hub includes the Amtrak train station, which is a station stop on the SunRail commuter rail system. There is a Greyhound bus station. The hub also features a bus terminal providing service by the Lynx network.

Kissimmee Gateway Airport has four fixed-base operators that provide service to the area. Kissimmee Gateway Airport (ISM) accommodates general aviation air service 24 hours a day with two paved airport runways—respectively 5,000 and 6,000 feet. There are also two flight training schools and a museum at the airport. Orlando International Airport can be reached from Kissimmee in 15 minutes by car.

The major roads in the Kissimmee area are Florida's Turnpike, Interstate 4, Osceola Parkway, and US 192. Among other important routes are US 17/92 that join with US 441 into the Orange Blossom Trail (OBT) and the John Young Parkway.

Public libraries

Osceola Library System operates the Hart Memorial Central Library in Kissimmee.

Notable people 

 José Aldo, Brazilian professional mixed martial artist.
 Irlo Bronson, Sr., politician; rancher
 Vassar Clements, bluegrass musician
 Dewayne Douglas, professional football player
 Buddy Dyer, politician; mayor of Orlando
 Tonga Fifita, professional wrestler; actor
 Brent Fullwood, football player
 Justin Gatlin, Olympic and world championship gold medalist sprinter
 Kristina Janolo, Miss Florida 2011
 George Frederic Kribbs, congressman
 Ray Lloyd, professional wrestler; martial artist
 A. J. McLean, singer from the Grammy-nominated Backstreet Boys
 James Mitchell, professional wrestling manager
 Joe Nasco, professional footballer
 Tito Paul, football player
 John Quiñones, attorney and former politician
 Henry L. Reaves, Georgia  politician from Kissimmee pioneer ranching family
 Edwin Rios, professional baseball player, 2020 World Series Champion
 William J. Sears, congressman
 Kissy Simmons, actor
 John Milton Bryan Simpson, judge
 Bobby Sippio, football player
 Justin Smith, professional poker player
 Jonathan Summerton, race car driver
 Colt Terry, army special forces
 Momo Thomas, American football player
 Brett Williams, football player
 Brownie Wise, businesswoman, Tupperware
 Richard Young, actor, played Fedora in Indiana Jones and the Last Crusade

References

External links 

 
Cities in Osceola County, Florida
County seats in Florida
Cities in the Greater Orlando
Populated places established in 1883
Cities in Florida
1883 establishments in Florida